Dibb may refer to:

The River Dibb
Mike Dibb (born 1940), English documentary filmmaker
Saul Dibb (born 1968), a British film director